Henry Rutherford "Harry" Jackman,  (November 5, 1900 – November 22, 1979) was a Canadian politician and successful entrepreneur. In 1973, he was made an Officer of the Order of Canada.

Life and career
Jackman represented the electoral district of Rosedale in the House of Commons of Canada from 1940 to 1949. He was first elected in 1940 as a member of Robert Manion's World War II National Government caucus (which, despite the name, formed the Official Opposition in the House of Commons of Canada), after wresting his party's nomination from Conservative incumbent Harry Gladstone Clarke. Jackman was re-elected in 1945 as a Progressive Conservative. He ran again in 1949 but was defeated.

In business, Jackman built the Empire Life group of financial service companies during the Great Depression.

In 1930, Jackman married Mary Coyne Rowell (1904–1994), daughter of Canadian lawyer and politician Newton Rowell. Together, they had four children – Henry (Hal), Eric, Edward and Nancy.

References
 
 Order of Canada citation

External links
 Henry R. Jackman – Mount Pleasant Cemetery

1900 births
1979 deaths
Businesspeople from Toronto
Members of the House of Commons of Canada from Ontario
Officers of the Order of Canada
Politicians from Toronto
Progressive Conservative Party of Canada MPs